Hawaiian Airlines flies to these destinations as of December 2020:

List

References

Lists of airline destinations
Hawaiian Airlines